Cameron Christopher David Chalmers (born 6 February 1997) is a Guernsey born British track and field sprinter who specialises in the 400 metres. The Guernsey record-holder for the 400 metres, he currently competes for both Guernsey and Great Britain.

Biography

Early life and career
Born in Guernsey, Chalmers was educated at Elizabeth College and began running with the local Guernsey Island Amateur Athletic Club in 2010. Chalmers competed in a variety of running events in 2013 before focusing on 400 m events from 2014 onwards. After leaving school, Chalmers secured a place at the University of Bath, where he would train under Dan Cossins. In 2015, Chalmers made his first junior appearance for Great Britain, competing in the under-20 4 × 400 m event at the Loughborough International. Chalmers won gold medals in both the 400 m and 4 × 400 m events while representing Guernsey at the 2015 Island Games. 

In 2016, Chalmers competed at the U20 World Championships in Bydgoszcz, where he set a then personal best of 46.51 seconds in the semifinals; he narrowly missed out on the finals, eventually finishing in 9th. Representing Bath in the 400 m final at the 2017 BUCS Championships, Chalmers won his fourth consecutive BUCS 400 m title. His winning time of 45.71 broke the seventeen-year-old championship record, and set a new Guernsey record. In June later that year, Chalmers improved his own Guernsey record time, setting a new personal best of 45.64 as he won the 400 m final at the U23 England Athletics Championships in Bedford.

Senior career

Ahead of the 2017 Island Games, Chalmers announced he was pulling out in order to focus on making selection for Great Britain at the 2017 World Championships. In July that year, Chalmers was named in the Great Britain relay squad, representing the team at the 2017 European Team Championships held in Lille, before being called up for the relay squad at the 2017 World Championships. On 10 February 2019, Chalmers won gold at the 2019 British Indoor Athletics Championships to take his first senior British 400 m title. The time was a personal indoor best of 46.26 and saw him qualify for the 2019 European Athletics Indoor Championships. On 27 December 2019, Athletics Weekly ranked Chalmers as the third best 400 m runner in their UK men's merit rankings for 2019.

Statistics

Source:

Personal bests

Seasonal bests

International competitions

National titles 
British Indoor Athletics Championships
400 metres: 2019

Personal life 
Chalmers' younger brother Alastair Chalmers is also a track and field athlete, specialising in the 400 metres hurdles. Their father Chris works with the Guernsey Athletics Club.

References

External links
 
 
 
 
 
 
 

1997 births
Living people
Guernsey male sprinters
Guernsey male athletes
British male sprinters
Olympic athletes of Great Britain
Athletes (track and field) at the 2020 Summer Olympics
Commonwealth Games competitors for Guernsey
Athletes (track and field) at the 2018 Commonwealth Games
European Championships (multi-sport event) silver medalists
European Athletics Championships medalists
People educated at Elizabeth College, Guernsey
People from Saint Peter Port